Andrei Ivanovich Timoshenko (15 August 1969 – 10 September 2010) was a Russian professional footballer and referee.

Club career
He made his debut in the Soviet Top League in 1987 for FC Dynamo Moscow.

European club competitions
With FC Dynamo Moscow.

 UEFA Cup 1987–88: 3 games.
 UEFA Cup 1991–92: 4 games.

Referee
From 2000 to 2006, he worked as a referee, mostly in the third-tier PFL, with a handful of games as a linesman in the second-tier FNL.

References

External links 
 

1969 births
Sportspeople from Rostov-on-Don
2010 deaths
Soviet footballers
Russian footballers
Association football midfielders
Russian football referees
Soviet expatriate footballers
Expatriate footballers in Switzerland
FC Rostov players
Russian Premier League players
FC Dynamo Moscow players
FC Dinamo Minsk players
FC Spartak Moscow players
FC Volgar Astrakhan players